Xestoleptura is a genus of flower longhorn beetles in the family Cerambycidae.

Species
These 10 species belong to the genus Xestoleptura:
 Xestoleptura baeckmanni (Plavilstshikov, 1936) c g
 Xestoleptura behrensi (LeConte, 1873) i b
 Xestoleptura behrensii (LeConte, 1873) c g
 Xestoleptura cockerelli (Fall, 1907) i c g b
 Xestoleptura crassicornis (LeConte, 1873) i c g b
 Xestoleptura crassipes (LeConte, 1857) i c g b
 Xestoleptura nigroflava (Fuss, 1852) c g
 Xestoleptura octonotata (Say, 1824) i c g b
 Xestoleptura rufiventris (Gebler, 1830) c g
 Xestoleptura tibialis (LeConte, 1850) i c g b
Data sources: i = ITIS, c = Catalogue of Life, g = GBIF, b = Bugguide.net

References

Lepturinae